Musafir Ram Bhardwaj is a Paun Mata musical instrument player from Himachal Pradesh, India. He was awarded the Padma Shri in 2014.

Life 

He was born in 1930 to Deewana Ram at Sunchai village, Bharmour area in Chamba district, Himachal Pradesh, India. He had no formal education. He learned playing Pauna Mata from his father at the age of 13, and has played ever since. He performed at 2010 Commonwealth Games in Delhi. He is also an agriculturist and tailor. Bhardwaj has four sons and two daughters.

Paun mata 
Paun mata is a traditional music instrument made of copper drum and lamb's skin. The Bhardwaj family play the instrument, and they have been invited to social and religious ceremonies in Himachal Pradesh to play the instrument.

Awards 

 Padma Shri, the fourth highest civilian award in India, in 2014
 Lifetime Achievement Award 2013 by Divya Himachal
 Rashtrapati Award in 2009

References 

1930 births
Living people
Musicians from Himachal Pradesh
Recipients of the Padma Shri in arts
Indian folk musicians
People from Chamba district
20th-century Indian musicians